The Kenya men's national under-18 basketball team represents Kenya in international under-18 (under age 18) basketball competitions. It is operated by the Kenya Basketball Federation (KBF).

See also
Kenya men's national basketball team
Kenya women's national under-18 basketball team

References

External links 
Africabasket: Kenya U18/19 National Team
Official FIBA Kenya Profile
FIBA Archive

Men's national under-18 basketball teams
Basketball teams in Kenya
Basketball